Sabine Poschmann (born 4 October 1968) is a German politician of the Social Democratic Party (SPD) who has been serving as a member of the Bundestag from the state of North Rhine-Westphalia since 2013.

Political career 
Poschmann became a member of the Bundestag in the 2013 German federal election, representing Dortmund. She is a member of the Committee on Economic Affairs and Energy. In this capacity, she is her parliamentary group’s rapporteur on small and medium-sized enterprises and self-employment. She also served on the Subcommittee on Regional Development from 2014 until 2017.

In the negotiations to form a so-called traffic light coalition of the SPD, the Green Party and the Free Democratic Party (FDP) following the 2021 federal elections, Poschmann was part of her party's delegation in the working group on economic affairs, co-chaired by Carsten Schneider, Cem Özdemir and Michael Theurer.

Since the 2021 elections, Poschmann has been serving as her parliamentary group’s spokesperson for sports.

Other activities 
 Business Forum of the Social Democratic Party of Germany, Member of the Political Advisory Board (since 2020)

References

External links 

  
 biography 

1968 births
Living people
Members of the Bundestag for North Rhine-Westphalia
Female members of the Bundestag
21st-century German women politicians
Members of the Bundestag 2021–2025
Members of the Bundestag 2017–2021
Members of the Bundestag 2013–2017
Members of the Bundestag for the Social Democratic Party of Germany